Thirty Years of Funk: 1969–1999 (also known as The Anthology) is a 1999 box set by Grand Funk Railroad, containing three new songs and several previously unreleased songs.

Track listing 
All songs written by Mark Farner, except where noted.

Disc one 
"Getting into the Sun" — The Pack* — 4:45
"Can't Be Too Long (Faucet)" — The Pack* — 6:00
"Got This Thing on the Move" (Mono) — The Pack* — 3:17
"Time Machine" — 3:44
"High on a Horse" — 2:55
"Mr. Limousine Driver" — 4:25
"Sin's a Good Man's Brother" — 4:49
"Aimless Lady" — 3:29
"Mean Mistreater" — 4:27
"I'm Your Captain (Closer to Home)" — 10:00
"Are You Ready" (Live) — 3:44
"Paranoid" (Live) — 6:40
"Inside Looking Out" (Live)* (John Lomax, Alan Lomax, Eric Burdon, Chas Chandler) — 16:25

Disc two
"Feelin' Alright" (Dave Mason) — 4:26
"Gimme Shelter" (Mick Jagger/Keith Richards) — 6:20
"I Can Feel Him in the Morning" (Don Brewer, Farner) — 7:14
"I Can't Get Along with Society"* — 4:42
"Upsetter" — 4:29
"Loneliness" — 8:38
"Trying to Get Away" — 4:11
"Walk Like a Man (You Can Call Me Your Man)" (Brewer, Farner) — 4:05
"Creepin'" — 7:02
"We're an American Band" (Brewer) — 3:27
"Hooray"* — 4:06
"The End"* (Brewer, Farner) — 4:11
"To Get Back In" — 3:56
"Destitute & Losin'"* — 7:02

Disc three
"Shinin' On" (Brewer, Farner) — 5:57
"The Loco-Motion" (Gerry Goffin, Carole King) — 2:47
"Some Kind of Wonderful" (John Ellison) — 3:22
"Bad Time" — 2:55
"Footstompin' Music" (Live) — 4:08
"Rock 'n Roll Soul" (Live) — 4:00
"Heartbreaker" (Live) — 7:26
"Take Me" — 5:10
"Sally" — 3:16
"Love Is Dyin'" — 4:14
"Can You Do It" (Richard Street, T. Gordy) — 3:17
"Pass It Around" (Brewer, Farner) — 5:00
"Crossfire" — 4:21
"Queen Bee" — 3:14
"We Gotta Get Out of This Place" (Live)* (Barry Mann, Cynthia Weil) — 5:14
"Pay Attention to Me"++ — 3:21
"All I Do"++ — 3:30
"In the Long Run"++ — 4:12

*: Previously unreleased
++: Newly recorded for this release

Personnel 

 Mark Farner – guitar, harmonica, percussion, keyboards, vocals
 Craig Frost – keyboards, vocals
 Mel Schacher – bass guitar
 Dennis Bellinger – bass guitar, vocals
 Don Brewer – percussion, drums, vocals, photography
 Jimmy Hall – harmonica
 Donna Hall – backing vocals

 David K. Tedds – compilation producer
 Grand Funk Railroad – producer
 Terry Knight – producer
 Lisa Reddick – producer
 John Rhys – producer
 Ron Nevison – engineer, mixing
 John Hendrickson – mixing
 Jimmy Romeo – engineer
 Evren Göknar – mastering
 Sam Gay – creative director

References 

1999 compilation albums
Grand Funk Railroad compilation albums
Albums produced by Terry Knight
Capitol Records compilation albums